Thomas Shine KC*HS (12 February 1872 – 22 November 1955) was an Irish-born prelate of the Roman Catholic Church. He served as the Bishop of Middlesbrough from 1929 to 1955.

Born in New Inn, County Tipperary, Ireland on 12 February 1872,  completing his clerical studies in St. Joseph's Seminary, Leeds and, he was ordained to the priesthood on 29 June 1894. He was appointed Coadjutor Bishop of Middlesbrough and Titular Bishop of Lamus on 12 April 1921. His consecration to the Episcopate took place on 29 June 1921, the principal consecrator was Bishop Richard Lacy of Middlesbrough, and the principal co-consecrators were Bishop Joseph Cowgill of Leeds and Archbishop Frederick Keating of Liverpool. On the death of Bishop Lacy on 11 April 1929, Shine automatically succeeded as the Bishop of Middlesbrough. He was appointed the personal title of archbishop on 19 January 1955.
His episcopal motto was rare enough in French: Briller sans bruler, a wink to his last name 'Shine:  'shining not burning' - the elegant alliteration holds only in French.
Archbishop Shine died in office on 22 November 1955, aged 83.

Death

Thomas Shine, second Bishop of Middlesbrough, died at the Sisters of Mercy Nursing Home at Whitby on 22 November 1955, in his 84th year. He had been a priest for 61 years, 34 years a bishop, and Bishop of the Diocese of Middlesbrough for 26 years. He died as an Archbishop, a Count of the Holy Roman Empire, Assistant at the Pontifical Throne, and Knight Commander of the Holy Sepulchre.

References

Further reading 
 Carson, Robert, The First 100 Years: A History of the Diocese of Middlesbrough 1878 - 1978, Middlesbrough, 1978.

1872 births
1955 deaths
20th-century Roman Catholic bishops in England
Irish emigrants to the United Kingdom
People from County Tipperary
Knights of the Holy Sepulchre
Roman Catholic bishops of Middlesbrough